Esfurin-e Olya (also Romanized as Esfūrīn-e ‘Olyā; also known as Esfūrīn-e Bālā, Esfūrīn-e Rāstī, and Esfūrīn Rāstī) is a village in Qaleh Asgar Rural District, Lalehzar District, Bardsir County, Kerman Province, Iran. At the 2006 census, its population was 43, in 14 families.

References 

Populated places in Bardsir County